Venaco is a commune in the Haute-Corse department of France on the island of Corsica.

Geography
Venaco is on the Vecchio River with Mont Rotondo,  to the west and Mont Cardo,  on the north. It contains Lake Bellebone.

Population

Transport 
The town is served by a station on the Corsican Railways.

See also
Communes of the Haute-Corse department

References

Communes of Haute-Corse